Moe Church is a parish church of the Church of Norway in Orkland municipality in Trøndelag county, Norway. It is the church for the Orkland parish which is part of the Orkdal prosti (deanery) in the Diocese of Nidaros. The white, wooden church was built in a cruciform style in 1867 by the builder Ole Fredriksen Rømmesmo. The church seats about 310 people.

History
The original chapel in Orkland was built in 1675 in the nearby village of Svorkmo where many people worked at a smelting factory. It was a cruciform building with tower on the roof with a church porch on the west end. On 3 June 1816, there was a river flood which swept through the area along the river where the cemetery and church were located. The church was heavily damaged and not much of the interior furniture was able to be saved. The church was torn down and its materials were used for flood protection in Svorkmo. The new church was a small, octagonal church. Eventually, the smelter in Svorkmo was closed down and the church was too small for the parish, so despite its young age, the church was closed and torn down in 1866.

The new site was more easily accessible for the people of the parish. After some delays, the construction began in 1866 and the church was consecrated on 28 December 1867 by bishop Andreas Grimelund. The church was extensively repaired under the leadership of John Tverdahl in 1958–1959.

Media gallery

See also
List of churches in Nidaros

References

Orkland
Churches in Trøndelag
Cruciform churches in Norway
Wooden churches in Norway
19th-century Church of Norway church buildings
Churches completed in 1867
1675 establishments in Norway